Anna Zara Backman, (27 October 1875 – 13 September 1949 in Gothenburg) was a Swedish actress.

Filmography
1915 – I kronans kläder
1916 – Svärmor på vift eller Förbjudna vägar
1916 – Bengts nya kärlek eller Var är barnet?
1930 – Lyckobreven
1938 – Du gamla du fria

References

1875 births
1949 deaths
Swedish film actresses
Swedish silent film actresses
Swedish stage actresses
20th-century Swedish actresses
Actors from Gothenburg